Holme is a hamlet in the civil parish of Biggleswade, in the Central Bedfordshire district of Bedfordshire, England.

The settlement is close to Edworth and Langford. The nearest town to Holme is Biggleswade.

Hamlets in Bedfordshire
Biggleswade